The  (and the earlier 481 and 483 series variants) was a Japanese limited express electric multiple unit (EMU) type introduced in 1964 by Japanese National Railways (JNR), and subsequently operated by the East Japan Railway Company (JR East), West Japan Railway Company (JR-West), and Kyushu Railway Company (JR Kyushu). Approximately 1,500 vehicles were built.

Variants
 481 series: Dual-voltage (1,500 V DC / 20 kV AC (60 Hz), introduced 1964
 483 series: Dual-voltage (1,500 V DC / 20 kV AC (50 Hz), introduced 1965
 485 series: Dual-voltage (1,500 V DC / 20 kV AC (50 Hz/60 Hz), introduced 1968

481 series
The 481 series trains were introduced in 1964 for use on Hokuriku Line limited services, and were capable of operating under 1,500 V DC or 20 kV AC (60 Hz) overhead wire power supplies. These train were subsequently operated by JR-West and JR Kyushu.

Interior

483 series
The 483 series trains were introduced in 1965 for use on Tohoku Main Line limited express services, and were capable of operating under 1,500 V DC or 20 kV AC (50 Hz) overhead wire power supplies. The non-powered trailer cars used in these sets were classified 481 series.

485 series

Variants
 485 series (original) (from 1968)
 485–200 series (from 1972)
 485–300 series (from 1974)
 485–1000 series (from 1975)
 485–1500 series (from 1974)
 485–3000 series (converted from former 485–1000 series trains between 1996 and 2001)
 Joyful Train variants

The 485 series trains were introduced in 1968. These trains were capable of operating under 1,500 V DC or 20 kV AC (50/60 Hz) overhead wire power supplies. The original design was closely based on the bonnet-style 181 series EMU, with the primary difference being ceilings that were  higher. However, trains produced from 1972 onwards, starting with the 485–200 series, featured a new design with a cab adapted from the 583 series sleeper expresses, which became the standard on nearly all subsequent JNR limited-express EMUs. The 485–200 series trains had gangway doors at the cab ends to allow trains to be operated in multiple, but the 485–300 series trains introduced from 1974 had no gangways. The 485–1500 series trains were built in 1974 for use in Hokkaido. The 485–1000 series trains built from 1975 onward incorporated design improvements from the DC-only 183-1000 series trains.

Operations
485 series trains were also used on the Raichō and Super Raichō services from 1968 until the service ended in March 2011. These trains sometimes utilized a panoramic cab car (numbered KuRo 481–2000) which was a "Green Car".

The Inaho and Hokuetsu services have used 485 and 485–3000 series trains since 1969.

The Hitachi service used 485 series trainsets from 1969 to 1998, when it was replaced by Super Hitachi and Fresh Hitachi services.

The Tsugaru service has used 485–3000 series trains since 2002, when the service started.

The Nikkō service used a dedicated 6-car 485 series set from March 2006 until 4 June 2011, which was occasionally substituted by a reserve 189 series set nicknamed Ayano. It was replaced by two 6-car 253 series sets from 4 June 2011.

The Noto has used a single 6-car 485 series train since March 2010, replacing the previous 489 series train.

Currently owned by JR East and formerly by JR-West and JR Kyushu, they also operated in the JR Hokkaido area on regular Hakuchō services, and in JR Central and JR Shikoku areas providing extra services. The last original JNR-style trainset (Sendai-based set A1+A2) operated by JR East was withdrawn in June 2016 after a series of special farewell Hibari, Aizu, and Tsubasa runs on 18 and 19 June.

Limited express

Joyful Train sets

Formations

485-3000 series
The six-car sets are formed as follows, with car 1 at the Itoigawa end.
The last 485–3000 series-operated rapid trains were discontinued.

 Car 1 includes "Green car" (first class) seating.
 Cars 2 and 4 each have two pantographs.

Preserved examples
, five 485 series cars are preserved, as follows.
 KuHa 481 26: Preserved at the Railway Museum in Saitama, Saitama.
 KuHa 481 246: Preserved at the Kyushu Railway History Museum in Kitakyushu. (front end section only)
 KuHa 481 256: Preserved at the JR Kyushu Kokura Depot in Kitakyushu since October 2016.
 KuHa 481 603: Preserved at the Kyushu Railway History Museum in Kitakyushu.
 MoHa 484 61: Preserved at the Railway Museum in Saitama, Saitama.

See also 
 489 series

References

Further reading
 
 
 

Electric multiple units of Japan
East Japan Railway Company
20 kV AC multiple units
West Japan Railway Company
Kyushu Railway Company
Hitachi multiple units
Train-related introductions in 1964
Kinki Sharyo multiple units
Tokyu Car multiple units
Kawasaki multiple units
Nippon Sharyo multiple units
1500 V DC multiple units of Japan